Island Park may refer to:

Places
Canada
Island Park, Ottawa, neighbourhood in Ottawa named for Island Park Drive

United States
Island Park, Idaho, a city
Island Park, Indiana, an unincorporated community
Island Park, Kosciusko County, Indiana, an unincorporated community 
Island Park, New York, a village
Island Park, Rhode Island, a former census-designated place in Rhode Island
Island Park, Wisconsin, an unincorporated community 
Island Park (Racine, Wisconsin), a neighborhood park
Island Park (Lake Winnebago), or Garlic Island, a small island in Wisconsin
Tate Field, known as Island Park and Mayo Island Park, a stadium in Richmond, Virginia